The Wickham House, also known as the Wickham-Valentine House, is a historic house museum on East Clay Street in Richmond, Virginia.  Completed in 1812, it is considered one of the finest examples of architecture from the Federal period. It was designated a National Historic Landmark in 1971.

It is now owned and operated by The Valentine, a private history museum devoted to the city's history.

Description and history

The Wickham House is located in Richmond's Court End neighborhood, a few blocks north of the Virginia State Capitol on the south side of East Clay Street at its corner with North 12th Street. Immediately to its west is the main gallery space of The Valentine.

The house is a two-story brick structure, covered by a shallow hip roof surrounded by a low balustrade.  The exterior walls have been finished in stucco scored to resemble ashlar stone.  It is three bays wide, with a slightly projecting central bay. The main entrance is set in a segmented-arch opening with flanking sidelights and a semi-oval transom, and is sheltered by a portico supported by paired columns and topped by a balustrade.  Windows are tri-part with narrow sections flanking wider ones; the ground-floor windows are set in recessed panels with blind segmented-arch headers.  The interior features a magnificent elliptical staircase and neoclassical wallpaintings with ancient Greek, Roman and Egyptian themes.

The house was built in 1812 for John Wickham to a design by Massachusetts architect Alexander Parris. It has also been attributed to Robert Mills and Benjamin Latrobe.  Wickham was a successful attorney who defended Vice President Aaron Burr during his trial for treason. The Victorian-era decorations found in its parlor were commissioned by John Ballard, its second owner.

In 1882 it was purchased by Mann Valentine II. He filled the house with artifacts, including some taken from excavations of Native American earthwork mounds in the Southeast, including South Appalachian Mississippian culture sites and historic Cherokee towns in North Carolina. He bequeathed them and the house to establish a museum for the city.

The house is now managed by The Valentine, the current name of original Valentine Museum. In 1990, John Canning & Co., an architectural arts restoration company out of Cheshire, Connecticut, was hired to restore the decorative painting throughout the house. This project was awarded the AIA Tower Award in 1992. It is open for tours.

See also
List of National Historic Landmarks in Virginia
National Register of Historic Places listings in Richmond, Virginia

References

External links

The Valentine: The 1812 John Wickham House
Photos
Wickham-Valentine House, 1015 East Clay Street, Richmond, Independent City, VA: 11 photos, 18 measured drawings, and 3 data pages at Historic American Buildings Survey

Houses on the National Register of Historic Places in Virginia
National Historic Landmarks in Virginia
Houses completed in 1812
Houses in Richmond, Virginia
Museums in Richmond, Virginia
Historic house museums in Virginia
Greek Revival houses in Virginia
Victorian architecture in Virginia
Federal architecture in Virginia
National Register of Historic Places in Richmond, Virginia
Historic American Buildings Survey in Virginia